The Småland Runic Inscription 48 is a Viking Age runestone engraved in Old Norse with the Younger Futhark runic alphabet in Torp, Forsheda parish, in Värnamo Municipality, Småland,  and the style of the runestone is possibly runestone style RAK.

Inscription
Transliteration of the runes into Latin characters

 ufakʀs × s[a]ti × stin × þosi × eftiʀ × uta × sun sin × harþa [k]u...n × tr(i)(k) -u - [f]arþ

Old Norse transcription:

 

English translation:

 "Ófeigr placed this stone in memory of Oddi, his son, a very good valiant man (who) died on a journey.(?)"

References

Runestones in Småland
Runestones in memory of Viking warriors